Dr Rameshwar Oraon (born 14 February 1947) is an Indian politician, who is the current Finance Minister of Jharkhand. He was a member of the 14th Lok Sabha. He represented the Lohardaga constituency of Jharkhand and is a member of the Indian National Congress (INC) political party.

He was formerly an Indian Police Service officer, of the 1972 intake. Recipient of President Police medal. He resigned in 2004 to contest the general election and won on the Congress ticket.

Oraon was chairperson of the National Commission for Scheduled Tribes from 28.10.2010 to 27/10/2013, in his 1st term, and again from 28/10/2013 to 26/08/2017, in his 2nd term, and is thus ex officio a member of the National Human Rights Commission (NHRC).

He also served as the Union Minister of State for Tribal affairs in Government of India, headed by Manmohan Singh. He has taken oath after winning the 2019 Jharkhand Legislative Assembly election as a Jharkhand minister on Sunday 29 December.

Political career 
Rameshwar Oraon served as the Member of Parliament, Lok Sabha.

On 26 August 2019, Rameshwar Oraon was appointed by the Congress, as the new president of Jharkhand State unit.

He contested the 2019 Jharkhand Legislative Assembly election from Lohardaga, as a member of the Congress. He defeated BJP candidate, Sukhdeo Bhagat.

On 29 December 2019, he was sworn in as the Cabinet Minister in the Government of Jharkhand, headed by Chief Minister Hemant Soren, along with  Alamgir Alam and Satyanand Bhokta.

Lok Sabha

Jharkhand Legislative Assembly

Awards 
- He received President Police Medal during his Police Service.

References

External links
 Home Page on the Parliament of India's Website

1947 births
Indian National Congress politicians from Jharkhand
Living people
People from Lohardaga district
India MPs 2004–2009
Lok Sabha members from Jharkhand
People from Palamu district
Jharkhand MLAs 2019–2024